Kollam G. K. Pillai was an Indian actor in Malayalam cinema. He acted in more than 50 films. He handled character roles and comedy roles during the 1970s and 1980s. He died on 30 January 2016.

Career
He was a theater artist turned movie actor. He entered into the field of dramas in 1950 through school festivals. He became active in theater with the famous drama Dahajalam in 1962. He has performed many famous plays on more than 4000 stages; these include Dahajalam, Neethipeedam, Rajadoothu, Ayiram Arakkilam, and Accident. Masappady Mathupillai (1973), directed by A. N. Thampi, was his debut movie. He worked as a conductor at Kerala State Road Transport Corporation. He acted in many television serials as well. He was not active in movies for a long time since the loss of his eyesight.

Personal life
He was born to Ammachiveedu Radhabhavan K.P. Gopalapillai and Kunjiyamma on 29 August 1934 at Kollam. He was married to Madhavikuttiyamma and the couple had four children, Jayasree, Ushakumari, Vijayasree and Bindusree. He was settled at Sankaramangalam in Chavara, Kollam. He died on 30 January 2016 at his daughter's house Oyoor in Kollam due to age-related ailments. He was 82.

Partial filmography
 Masappady Mathupillai (1973)
 Mucheettukalikkaarante Makal (1975)
 Pushpasharam (1976)
 Mukkuvane Snehicha Bhootham (1978)
 Choola (1979)
 Sayoojyam (1979)
 Lajjavathi (1979)
 Chandrahasam (1980)
 Deepam (1980)
 Vedikkettu (1980)
 Ithikkara Pakki (1980)
 Ivar
 Sooryan (1982)
 Justice Raja as Rajasekharan's father (1983)
 Kurishuyudham as Paappi (1984) as Paappi
 Swanthamevide Bandhamevide (1984)
 Ivide Thudangunnu as PC Pasu Villa (1984)
 Aa Neram Alppa Dooram (1985)
 Ulsavappittennu (1988)
 Arabikkadaloram (1995)

As a singer
 Kothikkothi as Pushpasharam (1976)

Television serials
 Manasaputhri (Asianet)
 Pakida Pakida Pambaram (Doordarshan)
Nilavilakku (Surya Tv)
Hallo Kuttichathan (Asianet)
Autograph (Asianet)

See also
 കൊല്ലം ജി.കെ. പിള്ള in Malayalam Wikipedia

References

External links

 Kollam G. K. Pillai at MSI

Male actors from Kollam
Male actors in Malayalam cinema
Indian male film actors
2016 deaths
1934 births
20th-century Indian male actors
21st-century Indian male actors